Poikilospermum is a genus of shrubs or tall woody climbers, consisting of at least 33 accepted species. The plants are found from India and China (Yunnan), the Sino-Himalayan region to Sulawesi and Jawa in Indonesia. Some of the plants are used by people.

Classification
The classification of the genus was dynamic and the in past was linked to the status of the family Cecropiaceae. At present, consensus places it in the family Urticaceae. One recent phylogenetic study placed it in a clade with Urtica, though two slightly older studies placed it as a sister clade to the Cecropieae (the former Cecropiaceae s. str.) and Urticaeae (Urticaceae s. antiq.). Older, nonphylogenetic, work placed the genus in Cecropiaceae, a family regarded as intermediate between Urticeae and Moraceae

Taxonomic history
Alexander Zippelius (1797-1828) is given authorship of the genus, publishing in Annales Musei Botanici Lugduno-Batavi (Amsterdam), 1: 203, in 1864. His work superseded that of Friedrich Anton Wilhelm Miquel (1811-1871). In 1978, Berg placed it in Cecropiaceae. Most recent work has been by Datwyler & Weiblen (2004), Zerega et al. (2005), and Hadiah et al. (2008) place the genus in Urticaceae.

Description
Members of Poikilospermum are shrubs or tall woody climbers (also known as lianas). The petiolate leaves are alternate; their stipules are often caducous, intrapetiolar, connate, and leathery; their veins are often prominently pinnate; cystoliths occur adaxially in circular groups, abaxially along veins, either punctiform or linear. The inflorescences are solitary and axillary dichotomously branched cymes, they are unisexual (the plants are dioecious). The glomerules are capitate and either on swollen peduncular receptacles (in P. subgen. Ligulistigma, continental Asia group), in agglomerations, or are free (in P. subgen. Poikilospermum, E Malaysia group). The male flowers are with 2-4 perianth lobes, free or slightly connate; there are two to four stamens, the filaments are straight (in P. subgen. Ligulistigma) or inflexed;  a rudimentary ovary is present. The female flowers have four perianth lobes, and are clavate-tubular and decussate-imbricate. The ovary in this genus is enclosed, with a short style, a  capitate or ligulate (in P. subgen. Ligulistigma) stigma; the ovule is orthotropous. The seeds have little or no endosperm. The cotyledons are ovate.

Distribution and habitat
Plants of the genus occur naturally from India across to Southeast Asia, China and Indonesia. Countries and regions in which plants of the genus grow include: Indonesia (Maluku, Sulawesi, Kalimantan, Jawa, Sumatera); Philippines; Malaysia (Sabah, Sarawak, Peninsular Malaysia); Thailand; Cambodia; Vietnam; Zhōngguó/China (South-central); Laos; Myanmar; India (including Nicobar Islands, Andaman Islands, Assam); Bangladesh; Tibet; East Himalaya. The genus has also been introduced to Jamaica. In China there are 3 species. Species often have high moisture requirement, occurring in Monsoon forests and rain forests, often near streams or other we places, at altitudes ranging from 500m to 1800m. In Cambodia P. suaveolens grows in the undergrowth of dense forests.

Human use
One species is used to produce ties (as in to tie things together).

Species
These species are accepted, as of February 2021:

Poikilospermum acuminatum 
Poikilospermum amboinense 
Poikilospermum amethystinum 
Poikilospermum amoenum 
Poikilospermum annamense 
Poikilospermum azureum 
Poikilospermum borneense 
Poikilospermum concolor 
Poikilospermum cordifolium 
Poikilospermum diffusum 
Poikilospermum dubium 
Poikilospermum erectum 
Poikilospermum forbesii 
Poikilospermum gjellerupii 
Poikilospermum grandifolium 
Poikilospermum hirsutum 
Poikilospermum intermedium 
Poikilospermum lanceolatum 
Poikilospermum longifolium 
Poikilospermum micranthum 
Poikilospermum microstachys 
Poikilospermum molle 
Poikilospermum naucleiflorum 
Poikilospermum nobile 
Poikilospermum oblongifolium 
Poikilospermum paxianum 
Poikilospermum peltatum 
Poikilospermum piperi 
Poikilospermum scabrinervium 
Poikilospermum scortechinii 
Poikilospermum suaveolens 
Poikilospermum subscaber 
Poikilospermum subtrinervium

References

Urticaceae
Urticaceae genera
Dioecious plants
Taxa named by Friedrich Anton Wilhelm Miquel